The South Caucasus, also known as Transcaucasia or the Transcaucasus, is a geographical region on the border of Eastern Europe and Western Asia, straddling the southern Caucasus Mountains. The South Caucasus roughly corresponds to modern Armenia, Georgia, and Azerbaijan, which are sometimes collectively known as the Caucasian States. The South Caucasus and the North Caucasus together comprise the larger Caucasus geographical region that divides Eurasia.

Geography

The South Caucasus spans the southern portion of the Caucasus Mountains and their lowlands, straddling the border between the continents of Europe and Asia, and extending southwards from the southern part of the Main Caucasian Range of southwestern Russia to the Turkish and Armenian borders, and from the Black Sea in the west to the Caspian Sea coast of Iran in the east. The area includes the southern part of the Greater Caucasus mountain range, the entire Lesser Caucasus mountain range, the Colchis Lowlands, the Kura-Aras Lowlands, Qaradagh, the Talysh Mountains, the Lankaran Lowland, Javakheti and the eastern portion of the Armenian Highland.

All of present-day Armenia is in the South Caucasus; the majority of present-day Georgia and Azerbaijan, including the exclave of Nakhchivan, also fall within the region. Parts of Iran and Turkey are also included within the region of the South Caucasus. Goods produced in the region include oil, manganese ore, tea, citrus fruits, and wine. It remains one of the most politically tense regions in the post-Soviet area, and contains three heavily disputed areas: Abkhazia, Artsakh, and South Ossetia. Between 1878 and 1917, the Russian-controlled province of Kars Oblast was also incorporated into the South Caucasus.

Etymology
Nowadays, the region is referred to as the South Caucasus or Southern Caucasia  (Ҹәнуби Гафгаз;). The former name of the region, Transcaucasia, is a Latin rendering of the Russian-language word Zakavkazye, meaning "[the area] beyond the Caucasus". This implies a Russian vantage point, and is analogous to similar terms such as Transnistria and Transleithania. Other, rarer forms of this word include Trans-Caucasus and Transcaucasus.

History

Prehistory
Herodotus, a Greek historian who is known as 'the Father of History' and Strabo, a Greek geographer, philosopher, and historian, spoke about autochthonous peoples of the Caucasus in their books. In the Middle Ages, various people, including Scythians, Alani, Armenians, Huns, Khazars, Arabs, Seljuq Turks, and Mongols settled in Caucasia. These invasions influenced on the culture of the peoples of the South Caucasus. In parallel Middle Eastern influence disseminated the Iranian languages and Islamic religion in Caucasus.

Located on the peripheries of Iran, Russia and Turkey, the region has been an arena for political, military, religious, and cultural rivalries and expansionism for centuries. Throughout its history, the region has come under control of various empires, including the Achaemenid, Neo-Assyrian Empire, Parthian, Roman, Sassanian, Byzantine, Umayyad, Abbassid, Mongol, Ottoman, successive Iranian (Safavid, Afsharid, Qajar), and Russian Empires, all of which introduced their faiths and cultures. Throughout history, most of the South Caucasus was usually under the direct rule of the various in-Iran based empires and part of the Iranian world. In the course of the 19th century, Qajar Iran had to irrevocably cede the region (alongside its territories in Dagestan, North Caucasus) as a result of the two Russo-Persian Wars of that century to Imperial Russia.

Ancient kingdoms of the region included Colchis, Urartu, Iberia, Armenia and Albania, among others. These kingdoms were later incorporated into various Iranian empires, including the Achaemenid Empire, the Parthian Empire, and the Sassanid Empire, during which Zoroastrianism became the dominant religion in the region. However, after the rise of Christianity and conversion of Caucasian kingdoms to the new religion, Zoroastrianism lost its prevalence and only survived because of Persian power and influence still lingering in the region. Thus, the South Caucasus became the area of not only military, but also religious convergence, which often led to bitter conflicts with successive Persian empires (and later Muslim-ruled empires) on the one side and the Roman Empire (and later the Byzantine Empire and Russian Empire) on the other side.

The Iranian Parthians established and installed several eponymous branches in the South Caucasus, namely the Arsacid dynasty of Armenia, the Arsacid dynasty of Iberia, and the Arsacid Dynasty of Caucasian Albania.

Middle ages and Russian rule
In the middle of the 8th century, with the capture of Derbend by the Umayyad armies during the Arab–Khazar wars, most of the South Caucasus became part of the Caliphate and Islam spread throughout the region. Later, the Orthodox Christian Kingdom of Georgia dominated most of the South Caucasus. The region was then conquered by the Seljuk, Mongol, Turkic, Safavid, Ottoman, Afsharid and Qajar dynasties.

After two wars in the first half of the 19th century, namely the Russo-Persian War (1804-1813) and the Russo-Persian War (1826-1828), the Russian Empire conquered most of the South Caucasus (and Dagestan in the North Caucasus) from the Iranian Qajar dynasty, severing historic regional ties with Iran. By the Treaty of Gulistan that followed after the 1804-1813 war, Iran was forced to cede modern-day Dagestan, Eastern Georgia, and most of the Azerbaijan Republic to Russia. By the Treaty of Turkmenchay that followed after the 1826-1828 war, Iran lost all of what is modern-day Armenia and the remainder of the contemporary Azerbaijani Republic that remained in Iranian hands. After the 1828-1829 war, the Ottomans ceded Western Georgia (except Adjaria, which was known as Sanjak of Batum), to the Russians.

In 1844, what comprises present-day Georgia, Armenia and the Azerbaijan Republic were combined into a single czarist government-general, which was termed a vice-royalty in 1844-1881 and 1905–1917. Following the 1877-78 Russo-Turkish War, Russia annexed Kars, Ardahan, Agri and Batumi from the Ottomans, joined to this unit, and established the province of Kars Oblast as its most southwesterly territory in the South Caucasus.

Modern era
After the fall of the Russian Empire in 1918, the South Caucasus region was unified into a single political entity twice, as Transcaucasian Democratic Federative Republic from 9 April 1918 to 26 May 1918, and as Transcaucasian Socialist Federative Soviet Republic from 12 March 1922 to 5 December 1936, each time to be dissolved into three Soviet Socialist Republics of Armenia, Azerbaijan and Georgia. All three regained independence in 1991 when the Soviet Union dissolved.

The Russo-Georgian War took place in 2008 across the South Caucasus, contributing to further instability in the region, which is as intricate as the Middle East, due to the complex mix of religions (mainly Muslim and Orthodox Christian) and ethno-linguistic groups.

Since their independence, the three countries have had varying degrees of success in their relations with Russia and other countries. In Georgia, after the Rose Revolution in 2004, the country, like the Baltic states, began integrating into Western Europe by opening up relations with NATO and the European Union. Armenia continues to foster relations with Russia while Azerbaijan relies less on Russia, strategically partnering with Turkey and other NATO states.

Demographics

Wine
The South Caucasus, in particular where modern-day Turkey, Georgia, Armenia and Iran are located, is one of the native areas of the wine-producing vine Vitis vinifera. Some experts speculate that the South Caucasus may be the birthplace of wine production. Archaeological excavations and carbon dating of grape seeds from the area have dated back to 8000–5000 BC. Wine found in Iran has been dated to  BC and  BC, while wine found in Georgia has been dated to BC. The earliest winery, dated to  BC, was found in Armenia.

See also

 Caucasus
 Caucasus Greeks
 Community for Democracy and Rights of Nations
 Eastern Europe
 Eastern European Group
 Eastern Partnership
 Eurasian Economic Union
 Eurovoc
 Ibero-Caucasian languages
 North Caucasus (Ciscaucasia)
 Peoples of the Caucasus
 Post-Soviet states
 Regions of Europe

References

External links

 Caucasian Journal – a multilingual online journal on the South Caucasus
 Caucasian Review of International Affairs – an academic journal on the South Caucasus
 Caucasus Analytical Digest – Journal on the South Caucasus
 Transcaucasia (The Columbia Encyclopedia article)
 
 

South Caucasus
Caucasus
Geography of Western Asia
Eastern Europe
Western Asia
Regions of Asia
Regions of Europe
Regions of Eurasia